George Leach is a Canadian musician and actor, best known for his work as a lead singer and songwriter.

Background

Leach is a Stl'atl'imx from Lillooet, British Columbia.

As an actor, Leach has appeared on This is Wonderland, North of 60, PSI Factor and Nikita. He also appeared in the six-part miniseries Into The West as Loved by the Buffalo. He released his first album Just Where I'm At in 2000. He subsequently performed at the National Aboriginal Achievement Awards, now the Indspire Awards. He won the Juno Award for Aboriginal Album of the Year in 2014 for his album Surrender.

Leach also participated in the  Canada World Youth program in 1994–95, working in Elmvale, Ontario, and Trat, Thailand.

Awards
George Leach has won 3 Aboriginal People's Choice Music Awards 
 2000 Best Male Artist of the Year 
 2000 Best Rock Album 
 2013 Aboriginal Songwriter of the Year
 2013 Best Rock CD for Surrender
 2013 Single of the Year for "Carry Me"

Discography

Albums
 2002 Just Where I’m At  
 2013 Surrender

Singles
2013 "Carry Me"

Television career

References

External links

Canadian male television actors
Canadian rock guitarists
Canadian male guitarists
Canadian rock singers
Canadian singer-songwriters
First Nations musicians
First Nations male actors
Living people
Male actors from British Columbia
People from Lillooet
St'at'imc people
Juno Award for Indigenous Music Album of the Year winners
1975 births
21st-century Canadian guitarists
21st-century Canadian male singers
Canadian male singer-songwriters